Two ships of the British Royal Navy have been named HMS Vengeur.

 The first  was acquired by capture from France in January 1809, and sold within the year.
 The second  was a 74-gun third rate Vengeur-class ship of the line of the Royal Navy, launched on 19 June 1810 at Harwich. She was broken up in 1843.

See also 
 

Royal Navy ship names